Christopher R. West (born April 7, 1950) is an American politician from Maryland from the Republican party. He is a member of the Maryland Senate from the 42nd district, representing Central and Northern Baltimore County. He was previously a member of the Maryland House of Delegates from District 42B.

Early life and career 
West was born on April 7, 1950, in Baltimore, Maryland. He attended Williams College, where he earned a B.A. degree in 1972, and the University of Pennsylvania School of Law, where he earned a J.D. degree in 1975. He was admitted to the Maryland Bar in 1975.

West became involved in politics by working as an attorney for the Maryland Republican Party from 1982 to 1996, and again from 1998 to 2003 after serving as the executive director of the Republican State Central Committee for two years. In 1988, he filed to run for Delegate to the Republican National Convention, representing Jack Kemp. He came in tenth place in a field of 13 candidates, receiving one percent of the vote.

In 1997, Semmes, Bowen & Semmes named West as a resident counsel in its Baltimore offices. He operated the commercial lending practice of the firm's banking, corporate, and securities practice group.

In 1998, West was seen as a possible candidate to succeed Joyce Lyons Terhes, who had announced that she would not seek re-election as the state's GOP chairman after a series of key losses across the state. He was once again considered a possible candidate for the seat after chairman Richard D. Bennett announced his resignation at the end of the year. He sought election as Chairman of the Maryland Republican Party that year, but was defeated by Michael Steele, the party's first vice chairman.

In February 2003, Governor Robert Ehrlich appointed West to the Maryland State Arts Council. He served as the council's vice-chair from 2006 to 2007.

In April 2013, West filed to run for the Maryland House of Delegates in District 42B. During the primary, there were attempts to recruit West to switch to the Senate race and challenge James Brochin, but he refused, saying that he had "no plans to switch over and run for State Senate." He won the Republican primary with 35.2 percent of the vote, coming second to Susan L. M. Aumann. He defeated Democrats Robert Leonard and Craig J. Little in the general election, receiving 33.3 percent of the vote.

In the legislature
West was sworn into the Maryland House of Delegates on January 14, 2015.

After Senator Jim Brochin announced that he would run to replace Baltimore County Executive Kevin Kamenetz, West announced he would run to succeed Brochin in the Senate. He ran on a slate with Republican Nino Mangione, who was running for House of Delegates. He defeated Robbie Leonard in the general election with 51.0 percent of the vote. West raised the third most funds out of every other Senator for his 2018 campaign, raking in a total $443,282.80 during the 2018 election cycle.

West was sworn into the Maryland Senate on January 9, 2019. Since 2020, he has served as the caucus parliamentarian of the Maryland Senate GOP caucus.

Committee assignments
Maryland Senate
 Member, Judicial Proceedings Committee, 2019–present (member, work group on COVID-19 & housing, 2020)
 Work Group to Study the Transformation of Manufacturing in Maryland's Emerging Digital Economy, 2021–present
 Member, Marijuana Legalization Work Group, 2019
 Senate President’s Advisory Work Group on Equity and Inclusion, 2020–2021
 Vice-Chair, Baltimore County Delegation, 2019–2021

Maryland House of Delegates
 Member, Health and Government Operations Committee, 2015–2019 (estates & trusts subcommittee, 2015–2017; insurance subcommittee, 2015–2019; health facilities & occupations subcommittee, 2017; health facilities & pharmaceuticals subcommittee, 2017–2019; health occupations & long-term care subcommittee, 2017–2019)
 Marijuana Legalization Work Group, 2019–
 Member, Death with Dignity Work Group, 2015
 Joint Committee on Federal Relations, 2015–2019
 Regional Revitalization Work Group, 2015–2019
 Punitive Damages Work Group, 2016–2017
 Affordable Care Act (ACA) Work Group, 2018

Other memberships
 Member, Maryland Legislative Sportsmen's Caucus, 2015–2019

Political positions
West has a reputation for being "far and away the most moderate Republican in the General Assembly." Although he represents a conservative district, he often works as a man of compromise. In January 2020, the American Conservative Union gave West a score of 40 percent on its annual legislative scorecard, the lowest score among Republicans.

Abortion
West supports banning abortions after a fetus reaches fetal viability unless the mother's life is at risk.

Business
In 2019, following the legislature's vote on a bill that would raise the state's minimum wage to $15 an hour by 2025, West agreed to participate in a work group proposed by Democratic Senator Katie Fry Hester that looked to study ways to help small businesses in the years leading up to the bill's full effective date.

In December 2020, the Maryland Free Enterprise Association gave West a score higher than 70 percent, making him the only senator to earn such a high score.

COVID-19 pandemic
In August 2021, West signed onto a letter calling on the Maryland State Board of Education to issue a universal masking mandate for students and teachers across the state. He was the only Republican to sign onto the letter.

Crime
West introduced legislation in the 2020 legislative session that would end the practice of suspending drivers licenses for unpaid court fines and fees. The bill passed unanimously and became law on May 8, 2020.

West introduced legislation in the 2021 legislative session that would abolish life without parole for those who committed crimes as juveniles and allow those who have served 20 years or more to petition to a judge for release. The bill passed with bipartisan support, but was vetoed by Governor Larry Hogan in April. The legislature voted to override Hogan's veto on the bill on April 10, 2021.

Elections
West introduced legislation in the 2020 legislative session that would require agencies to provide a voter application form and general voting information to people preparing to transition back to society from prison. The bill passed the House of Delegates by a vote of 93-36.

Environment
In April 2019, West voted against legislation that would mandate a 50 percent renewable energy target for 2030 over his disapproval of a provision that would provide trash incinerators with renewable energy subsidies.

In December 2019, the Maryland Public Interest Research Group gave West a score of 83 percent on its annual legislative scorecard.

During the 2021 legislative session, West introduced legislation that would create timelines for Maryland's remaining power plants to transition away from coal and establish a transition fund to mitigate economic impacts for employees. He later withdrew the bill over worries that it would not pass in the House, but announced in March 2021 that he had worked out a deal with AES Corporation that would cause the Warrior Run Generating Station to stop burning coal in 2030.

West introduced an amendment to the Climate Solutions Now Act of 2021 that would require newly constructed school buildings that use funding from the Build to Learn Act to install rooftop solar panels. The amendment failed by a vote of 15-31. He was also one of two Senate Republicans to vote in favor of passing the climate action plan, which passed the Senate by a vote of 34-11.

In November 2021, the Maryland League of Conservation Voters gave West a score of 100 percent on its annual legislative scorecard.

In March 2022, West introduced an amendment to the Climate Solutions Now Act of 2022 that would require local school systems to consider installing solar panels on roofs of new school buildings, requiring school systems that decide against doing so to explain why to the Interagency Commission on School Construction. The amendment was passed in a 30-14 vote.

Gambling
West introduced legislation in the 2016 legislative session that would ban off-track betting at the Maryland State Fairgrounds. He later amended the bill to allow off-track betting, but required that the Fairgrounds enter a contract agreement with the Greater Timonium Community Council, and banned slots and table games.

West introduced legislation in the 2020 legislative session that would legalize sports betting in Maryland's casinos and pari-mutuel racetracks.

Housing
In June 2021, West signed onto a letter that urged Governor Larry Hogan to use federal rent relief funding support legislation that would provide low-income tenants with access to legal representation in eviction cases.

Marijuana
West does not support the legalization of marijuana, saying that he would oppose it until a method to test people for being under the influence of marijuana is developed. West introduced legislation in the 2019 legislative session that would limit companies to operating up to six marijuana dispensaries through ownership or management agreements. The bill passed and was signed into law at a limit of four dispensaries.

West introduced legislation in the 2020 legislative session that would allow actively licensed physicians to become a certifying provider of medical marijuana. The bill passed unanimously and became law on May 8, 2020.

Policing
West introduced legislation in the 2021 legislative session that would prohibit law enforcement agencies from purchasing certain military equipment through the 1033 program. The bill passed unanimously in the Senate, but did not receive a vote in the House of Delegates.

In February 2021, West voted in favor of legislation that would repeal the Law Enforcement Officers' Bill of Rights.

In April 2021, West co-sponsored legislation that would order police departments to provide body-worn cameras for on-duty police officers by 2025. However, he withdrew his support for the bill after it was amended to include provisions that would create an employee assistance mental health program and implement a statewide use of force policy.

West introduced two amendments to the Police Reform and Accountability Act of 2021: the first to insert portions of the Senate's Law Enforcement Officers' Bill of Rights repeal into Jones' bill and the other to establish that law enforcement agencies have the burden of proof under a preponderance of the evidence during trial board proceedings and that officers can only be disciplined for cause. Both amendments made it into the final bill.

West opposed provisions in "Anton's Law" that would allow police misconduct complaints to become public, introducing an amendment that would keep unsubstantiated complaints private. The amendment was rejected on a party line vote.

Social issues
In 2019, West voted in favor of legislation that would make it legal for doctors to prescribe a lethal dose of medication to terminally ill patients who want to end their lives. The bill failed to pass out of the Senate, receiving a 23-23 vote. West was the only Republican to vote in favor of the bill.

In February 2020, West co-sponsored legislation that would make single-occupant bathrooms gender neutral.

In August 2020, West signed onto a letter calling on the Baltimore County Public Schools system to ban hate symbols in the form of Confederate flags and swastikas.

West introduced legislation in the 2021 legislative session that would create penalties for vandalizing or destroying historically significant statues in Maryland.

In February 2021, West cosponsored legislation that would provide students with access to period products in school bathrooms. The bill passed and became law on May 30, 2021.

Electoral history

References

External links 
 

Living people
1950 births
Politicians from Baltimore
Williams College alumni
University of Pennsylvania Law School alumni
Republican Party members of the Maryland House of Delegates
Republican Party Maryland state senators
21st-century American politicians